Gosforth Academy (formerly Gosforth High School) is an English secondary school in Gosforth, Newcastle upon Tyne. As well as having a sixth form department it is a specialist Language College. Many of its mainstream students come from three large feeder middle schools: Gosforth Central Middle School, Gosforth East Middle School and Gosforth Junior High Academy.

It also houses a large sixth form college, where the majority of the lower school students continue their studies. There is a Special education centre within the school to aid students who need it. The school houses 'Gosforth Community Education', which provides courses for adults within the local community. The school is also a regional centre for young people with visual impairment.

Both Gosforth Academy and Gosforth Junior High Academy are managed under a single company, Gosforth Federated Academies Limited, incorporated 5 November 2010.

History 
The school was founded in 1973 through the merger of two local comprehensive schools with Gosforth Grammar School.

1921–1944 
In 1921 Gosforth Secondary School opened. The first permanent buildings were built in the late 1920s. The site was on the opposite side of the Great North Road, to the current site.

1944–1973 
Due to the Education Act 1944 the school became Gosforth Grammar School in 1944. In the early 1960s the current site of the School began to be used.

1973–2000 

In 1973 the local council adopted the three-tier education system. Following this, the Grammar school was combined with Gosforth County Secondary School and Gosforth East County Secondary School, and Gosforth High School was born. The high school moved permanently to the 1960s site.

The site on which Gosforth Grammar stood is now used by Gosforth Central Middle School. The Grammar School building was used by Central Middle, until it was replaced in 2004.

2000–2010 
Between 2000 and 2002 the school buildings were renovated, and the new facilities were opened by the prime minister Tony Blair on 29 November 2002. This visit took place at the time of strike action by firefighters, who jeered Blair outside the school, gaining media attention. This new building cost a total of £9 million, of which £6.3 million came from a government grant, "New Deal for Schools", £1.85 million from "Newcastle Great Park" and £800,000 from Newcastle City Council. After the completion of the new buildings, which bear a striking resemblance to airport architecture, the old 'West Wing' was demolished in 2004.

Keith Nancekievill left the school to take up the head teachers post at Hinchingbrooke School, Cambridgeshire, in February 2003 after being head at Gosforth for 15 years. Nancekievill was succeeded by Hugh Robinson who served as head teacher/principal between 2003 and 2020.

In September 2006, a new discipline system was introduced, known as the 'PRAISE Code' (Perform, Reward, Achieve, Inspire, Succeed, Excel).

Junior School 

In September 2006, Gosforth High took over the administration duties of Gosforth West Middle School, in a Federation style agreement. The Federation came into action on 1 January 2007 and Gosforth West was later renamed Gosforth Junior High School after the 2007 Easter break.

The future as an Academy 
In December 2010, the high school became an academy, known as Gosforth Academy, as did the Junior School, now Gosforth Junior High Academy. The Junior Academy building was replaced with a new building which opened in September 2011, replacing the 1930s buildings. The Academy also opened its long anticipated sports facilities.

In 2015 the academy unveiled a bid to build an additional 1,200-place secondary school in Newcastle Great Park as potential plan to meet the demand for school places from the expanding residential community in the area that is adjacent to Gosforth.

In 2018 Seaton Burn College became part of Gosforth Federated Academies and was renamed North Gosforth Academy. In November 2020 Preit Chahal succeeded Hugh Robinson as Principal; Robinson remains as CEO of the Academy.

Achievements 
The academy is a designated ambassador school for the National Academy for Gifted and Talented Youth, in addition to becoming a beacon school in 2001. Gosforth Academy is currently the only school with DFES "Training School" status in Newcastle and has been a specialist Language College since 1996. In 1999, the school gained Investors in People accreditation.

In 2008 at the first gathering of the High Performing Schools group, Gosforth High School was recognised as being ranked in the top 10% of schools nationally and the highest performing school in Newcastle. In March 2008, Ofsted inspected the school and rated it 'outstanding'. Coupled with the improved 2008 exam results the school has been classified as a high performing specialist school for the next four years.

Emblem 

The school's emblem has 3 main parts: the tree of growth and knowledge, the badge of Newcastle city and the Northumberland coat of arms. For a period of time the school's motto had been "High Achievers".

Facilities 
Gosforth Academy has a wide range of quality of facilities. Some areas are in desperate need of modernisation whilst some are up-to-date. Much of the original 1960s building of the then High School no longer exists.

Gosforth Academy's present building is actually 2 buildings; one building has 2 floors and the other 3 and a half floors (the half being a Mezzanine Level which is currently used as an art gallery and a computer suite). This difference in buildings can be clearly seen when you are crossing between the two via stairs. The room numbers for the bottom floor begin with a zero; the middle floor room numbers begin with a one; and the top floor room numbers begin with two.

The 2002 building cost a total of £9 million. Companies that assisted with the construction of the 2002 building included Newcastle City Design Department, Multicare and Desco. Desco handled the Mechanical and Electrical services for Phase 3, costing £3 million. The school is also part of the "Building Schools for the Future" Initiative.

In 2009 plans to extend the back of the school with a new sports hall were accepted. Building commenced soon after, and was unaffected by the change in the Building Schools for the Future policy. A multimillion-pound gym full of P.E. equipment was built ready for use by September 2011. This is accompanied by a 9-court sports hall.

Facility list 
The school has:
 15 Science laboratories
 12 ICT rooms (some assigned to a particular subject)
 2 large libraries (Goodfellow and Cousins)
 A large art department
 A sixth form common room
 A smaller year 11 common room
 A fully equipped Drama studio
 3 small Music practice rooms
 A dance studio
 One Gym
 One Indoor Sports Court (badminton, basketball & football)
 One Indoor 9 court Sports Hall (badminton, basketball, hockey & football)
 2 Outdoor Sports Courts (tennis, hockey, basketball, netball, football)
 One Weight-Training room.
 A Student Support Base, which also contains a police base for the area.

The school also has facilities for young people with visual impairment.
The two libraries are the Cousins Library, a new library which opened on 8 September 2008 a library for years 9, 10 and 11, and the Old Library, known as the Learning Resource Centre or LRC for sixth form.

The school is able to teach many languages; their mainstream teaching for Modern European languages is concentrated in French, German, Italian and Spanish.

Computer facilities 
There are over 50 computers in total in the libraries and 12 dedicated computer rooms. Most of the classrooms have interactive whiteboards (most of which are Promethean ACTIVboards). A combination of wired and wireless networks allowing teachers to use their laptops anywhere.

The register in the school is taken via computer, using a Student information system, called SIMS.net, which uses the main PC system. The school also utilises a Virtual learning environment, under the Frog platform.

In the past the school had used a Bromcom hand-held student information system for taking register and had computer workstations provided by Elonex Systems.

Sports department 
The current Sport@Gosforth building was officially opened by former students Alan Shearer and Kathryn Tickell on 3 October 2011.

The school had been planning to replace the previous indoor sports courts with a modern sports facility for many years. The previous indoor sports courts which had earned the nickname "The Shed" by students and teachers alike in the school was demolished in early 2010.

Some of the plans were to have 8 new sports courts within the new building and provision for "all-weather pitches". The current building is a 2-storey sports hall, activities suite and classroom extension to south and west elevation to existing school, with a synthetic turf pitch and 6 × 15 m high lighting columns. The planning application was submitted on 25 November 2008 by AURA Ltd, a local education partnership company in which the council has a 10% share, and was conditionally granted on 5 March 2009. Building work by contractors Sir Robert McAlpine commenced late in the summer of 2009, on the all-weather pitch, and the all-new sports facilities were completed by summer 2011. The synthetic turf pitch was first used on 2 December 2009, and is available for lettings out of school hours. In total the new facilities include a 6 court Sports Hall, new changing rooms, a Fitness Suite, a Climbing wall, a master classroom and a large flexible learning space. These new facilities have now been opened as a state-of-the-art sports centre which facilitates the needs of the pupils and the community. It has been given the name Sport@Gosforth.

The Newcastle Falcons rugby team and their Academy have linked up with the School in an apprenticeship scheme; in 2007 eight students joined the rugby academy for two years. England and Newcastle Falcons player Jamie Blamire was a product of this scheme.

In 2012, the Year 9 squash team won the national championship for squash, with the football team winning the City Cup.

Post-16 sixth form 
Rated as one of the best 6th form colleges in the Newcastle upon Tyne area, Gosforth Academy's Sixth Form College offers a larger array of subjects, which its students can study. Not only can students study traditional AS and A-Level subjects, but the 6th form also offers newer qualifications such as BTEC First Diplomas, BTEC National Certificates and GCSE re-sits.

Location 
Gosforth Academy is located on Knightsbridge, connecting to a section of the Great North Road in the Parklands electoral ward. The school is opposite the Asda Gosforth superstore (formerly a multi-use stadium), near a small M&S store and the Regent Centre business complex. Between the school and Regent Centre Metro Station there is a modern apartment block (formerly a Territorial Army centre) and on the other side of the front field there are a set of shops, including BP petrol station.

Many students use the local metro and bus systems to travel to the school, due to the proximity of Regent Centre transport Interchange to the school. The school field also runs parallel to the metro line, including a short platform used for reversing the direction of Metro trains going out of service. The edge of the back field, next to the 'West Wing' is the location of Grange First School.

Results 
In 2013, the school achieved the highest GCSE results in the city of Newcastle upon Tyne. 78% of its students achieved the Goldmark 5 GCSE Passes (A*-C) including English and Maths.

The GCSE Goldmark and A-Level results score by year for 2006 to 2011 are listed below:

Ofsted report 2008 
In March 2008, Gosforth High School was rated as outstanding by Ofsted. Ofsted noted that "students of all backgrounds often make outstanding progress in all aspects of their development because they are exceptionally well cared for and supported". Guidance at key points in their school career and with health, social or personal problems was seen to be very good, particularly the personal and academic were seen as excellent. The management and leadership were noted as being outstanding. Ofsted also highlighted that the behaviour within the school, both in and out of class was excellent, enabling a safe environment. The overall teaching quality was marked as "usually good" with some "inspirational" lessons. The school was deemed to have made good progress since the last inspection. Ofsted outlined two main items needed to be improved in the future which were that lesson observations had to focus on the effectiveness of learning and that work given was matched better to the ability of the student.

In April 2011, Ofsted conducted an interim assessment on the school. This was because, as part of the 2011 Education Bill, schools previously assessed to be outstanding, were inspected to ensure they had maintained their standard. If they had done so, they would no longer be inspected, until Ofsted received any concerning information. Gosforth Academy was deemed to have maintained the "outstanding" rating previously given in March 2008.

Feeder schools 
There are three middle schools in Gosforth, one of which is federated with the Academy (High School), that act as feeder schools to the Academy (High School):

Gosforth Central Middle School
Gosforth East Middle School
 Gosforth Junior High Academy

Notable alumni 
See :Category:People educated at Gosforth Academy

Gosforth Grammar School

Gosforth High School

Gosforth Academy

References

External links 
 Gosforth Federated Academies
 Gosforth Academy Main School
 Gosforth Academy Sixth Form
 Sport@Gosforth
 School information at Newcastle City Council

Educational institutions established in 1921
Academies in Newcastle upon Tyne
Upper schools in Newcastle upon Tyne
1921 establishments in England